Asteroscopus is a genus of moths of the family Noctuidae.

Species
 Asteroscopus sphinx – The Sprawler (Hufnagel, 1766)
 Asteroscopus syriaca (Warren, 1910)

References
 Asteroscopus at Markku Savela's Lepidoptera and Some Other Life Forms
 Natural History Museum Lepidoptera genus database

Psaphidinae